The New York Game Awards is an annual award show honoring video games by nonprofit New York Videogame Critics Circle (NYVGCC). The first awards were held in 2012, honoring previous year's contributions to the video game industry and showcases the group's education work with underserved communities. New York Videogame Critics Circle's stated goals are to promote awareness of, and education for, video games writing and journalism in the New York City area.

History 

The New York Videogame Critics Circle (NYVGCC) was founded in 2011 by writer Harold Goldberg, along with inaugural members Evan Narcisse, Tracey John, Russ Frushtick, and Andrew Yoon. While the NYVGCC was initially created to advocate for its members, it also provides classes and mentoring to underserved portions of the New York City community. Beginning in 2012, the NYVGCC has hosted an annual awards show that distributes trophies to game studios, individual game contributors, and game journalists. The first awards show was held in 2012 as a collaboration with New York University's Game Center. Since then, the NYVGCC has held seven more award ceremonies and has incorporated live music, trailer premieres, and hosting by members of The Daily Show writing staff. In 2019, former Nintendo of America president Reggie Fils-Aimé joined the NYVGCC's board of directors to help Goldberg and the group continue its outreach to the DreamYard Prep School, and new initiatives such as classes in Bronxworks network of homeless shelters.

Ceremonies

Award winners

1st (2012) 
The First Annual New York Games Awards took place on February 2, 2012, at New York University's Cantor Film Center. 21 games journalists voted on the award winners, and about 250 guests attended. Logan Cunningham, narrator of Bastion, served as the host.

2nd (2013) 
The Second Annual New York Game Awards were held at NYU-Poly on February 5, 2013. Writer Daniel Radosh of The Daily Show hosted the event, and musical acts MC Frontalot and Schäffer the Darklord performed.

3rd (2014) 
The Third Annual New York Game Awards were hosted by Daniel Radosh for the second year in a row. Folk music group Future Folk performed, and Irrational Games premiered a video about the second episode of BioShock Infinite: Burial at Sea.

4th (2015) 
In 2015, the New York Game Awards switched venues and took place at Villain, an event space in Williamsburg, Brooklyn. The awards show routine was written and hosted by The Daily Shows writing staff.

5th (2016) 
In 2016, The Daily Show writer Owen Parsons took over writing and hosting the awards. Game studio The Molasses Flood premiered a trailer for The Flame in the Flood, and Wyclef Jean demoed music he contributed to rhythm game Lost in Harmony.

6th (2017) 
The Sixth Annual New York Game Awards were held at the Abron Arts Center and featured a musical performance by all-women accordion band The Main Squeeze.

7th (2018) 
The 7th Annual New York Game Awards were hosted by Devin Delliquanti of The Daily Show. Musician Shilpa Ray performed.

8th (2019) 

In 2019, the New York Game Awards moved to the SVA Theatre in Manhattan. The event, hosted again by Devin Delliquanti with appearances by The Daily Shows Daniel Radosh, Josh Johnson and Kat Radley, featured a performance by guitarist and vocalist Maddie Rice, as well as trailer premieres for Inkle title Heaven's Vault and Shawn Alexander Allen's Treachery in Beatdown City.

9th (2020) 
The 9th Annual New York Game Awards were held on January 21, 2020. The recipient of the Andrew Yoon Legend award was the former Nintendo of America president Reggie Fils-Aimé.

10th (2021) 
The 10th Annual New York Game Awards were held on January 26, 2021. Due to the COVID-19 pandemic, the event was held virtually, co-hosted by Reggie Fils-Aimé. The nominees were announced on January 5, 2021. Immediately before the show, Fils-Aimé partook in a roundtable discussion with Jack Tretton and Robbie Bach, formerly of Sony and Microsoft, respectively. Hades won the Big Apple Award for Game of the Year. The Andrew Yoon Legend Award was given to Hideo Kojima, Jerry Lawson, and Brenda and John Romero.

11th (2022) 
The 11th Annual New York Game Awards were held on February 1, 2022. The event was originally set to be held at the SVA Theatre, but was held virtually for the second time due to the COVID-19 pandemic. The nominees were announced on January 11, 2022.

12th (2023) 
The 12th Annual New York Game Awards took place on January 17, 2023, returning to the SVA Theatre for the first in-person show since 2020. Fils-Aimé and Goldberg returned to host, alongside Makeda Byfield. Planning for the show had begun by August 2022, and the nominees were announced on January 4, 2023. Phil Spencer received the Andrew Yoon Legend Award.

References 

2011 establishments in New York City
Non-profit organizations based in New York City
Video game awards
Video game design
Video game journalism